Theodore Hugh Rosslyn Koch  (21 December 1886 - 24 April 1961) was a Ceylonese businessman, company director and politician.

Koch was born on 21 December 1886, the sixth child and fourth son of Cecil Theodore (1852-1890) and Evelyn Harriet (née Foenander) (1855-1919). Koch married Florence Lilian Kriekenbeek (1891-?) on 7 April 1915; they had four children: Kathleen Frances Theodora (b.1916); Henry Templar Rosslyn (b.1918); Pamela (b.1926); and Wilhelm Louis (b.1948).

In 1938, he became a founding director of the Ceylon Insurance Company, going on to serve as its chairman from 1942 to 1960. In April 1948 Koch was appointed as the Burgher Member of the Ceylon House of Representatives, following the resignation of Edward Frederick Noel Gratiaen, who had been appointed as Justice of the Supreme Court. He was one of six members appointed by the Governor-General to represent important interests which were not represented or inadequately represented in the House. Koch served in three successive parliaments until he resigned in October 1959, wbeing succeeded by Dr. Eric Brohier. During his tenure, Koch served as the chair of the Public Accounts Committee.

In the 1952 New Year Honours, Koch was made an Officer of the Order of the British Empire (Civil Division) for his services to the export trade.

From 1952 until 1956 Koch served as the chairman of the Employers' Federation of Ceylon.

References

1886 births
Date of death missing
Burgher politicians
Sri Lankan people of German descent
Members of the 1st Parliament of Ceylon
Members of the 2nd Parliament of Ceylon
Members of the 3rd Parliament of Ceylon
Ceylonese Officers of the Order of the British Empire